John Burke (11 May 1946 – 11 December 2006) was an Irish sculptor.

Burke studied at the Crawford School of Art and Design in Cork and at the Royal Academy of London. He spent most of his career in the Cork area and for a time taught at Crawford, where his students included Eilis O'Connell and Vivienne Roche.

Burke was a founding member of Aosdána in 1981.

Works

 Etsumi (1973, Belfast, Ulster Mus.)
 Red Cardinal (1978, Dublin, Bank of Ireland Headquarters)

References

1946 births
2006 deaths
Irish sculptors
Aosdána members
People from County Tipperary
20th-century Irish sculptors
Male sculptors
20th-century male artists